Motoyoshi may refer to:

Motoyoshi (name)
Motoyoshi District, Miyagi, a rural district in Miyagi Prefecture, Japan
Motoyoshi, Miyagi, a former town in Motoyoshi District
Motoyoshi Station, a railway station in Kesennuma, Miyagi Prefecture, Japan